The Rural Alberta Advantage is a Canadian indie rock band that formed in 2005 in Toronto, Ontario. The band consists of Nils Edenloff on lead vocals and guitar, Amy Cole (Robin Hatch between September 2016 and January 2018) on keyboards, bass, and backing vocals, and Paul Banwatt on drums. They have released four albums and are signed to Paper Bag Records in Canada and Saddle Creek Records internationally. In 2011, they were nominated for a Polaris Music Prize.

History 
The Rural Alberta Advantage was formed after the band members met while organizing an open-mic event at The Winchester in Cabbagetown. The band's name was coined by Edenloff's brother, when he wrote in an e-mail to Edenloff that he was planning to explore "the rural Alberta advantage" by spending some time back on the family farm near Donalda, Alberta where they had spent part of their childhoods. 

First formed in 2005, the band recorded a demo tape and released an EP independently before completing their first full-length album, Hometowns, in early 2008. Hometowns was recorded and produced from April 2007 to March 2008 by Roger Leavens at BoomBox Sound in Toronto, Ontario. The band toured extensively across Canada, including shows at the Pop Montreal and Halifax Pop Explosion festivals, to support Hometowns.

The band was selected as eMusic's featured artist of the month for November 2008. The band subsequently signed to Saddle Creek Records in 2009, and Hometowns was re-released by the label in July. The band was also selected as the X3 Artist of the month by Aux.tv, CBC Radio 3 and Exclaim! for July 2009.

Their second LP, Departing, was released on March 1, 2011. The album was named as a longlisted nominee for the 2011 Polaris Music Prize.

Their third album Mended with Gold was released on September 30, 2014. In the fall of 2014, Mended with Gold was featured on NPR's All Songs Considered list for the top albums of September.

On September 12, 2016 Amy Cole announced her departure from the group via the band's website. On September 18, the band announced a new tour with keyboard, bass pedal and backup vocals being supplied by Robin Hatch. On November 7, the band announced that their fourth studio album is forthcoming.

Their fourth studio album The Wild was released on October 13, 2017. Its lead track "Beacon Hill" was inspired by the 2016 Fort McMurray wildfires.

In January 2018, the band announced that Cole had rejoined their lineup.

On March 31, 2022, their second EP The Rise was released with six songs.

To build up anticipation for their 2023 tour, the single Plague Dogs was released on January 31, 2023.

Discography

Albums

EPs
 The Rural Alberta Advantage EP (2006)
 The Rise (2022)

Singles

Compilations
 Friends in Bellwoods (2007): "The Air"
 Friends in Bellwoods II (2009): "Rough and Tumble" (early version of "Barnes' Yard" from Departing)

References

External links
 The Rural Alberta Advantage

Musical groups established in 2005
Musical groups from Toronto
Canadian indie rock groups
Paper Bag Records artists
Saddle Creek Records artists
2005 establishments in Ontario